NEC Software Solutions, formerly Northgate Public Services, is a provider of specialist software and outsourcing services for the public sector and is based in the United Kingdom. This followed its acquisition by NEC Corporation in January 2018.

History

Early years
The company was founded as CMC, or Computer Machinery Company Limited, on 18 September 1969 by Ray Parry. 
They were originally distributors and subsequently manufacturers of key-to-disk computer systems made by the US-based Computer Machinery Corporation. The systems were used by companies and government departments for data capture. In 1976, CMC developed a bit-slice based intelligent terminal—the P99—which it used both as a front-end processor to the key-to-disk systems and as a terminal in its own right. It then evolved the P99 into the P141—a true front-end processor, which it used to implement a new data capture system called Sovereign. This was used in manufacturing companies such as Rolls-Royce plc, British Steel Corporation and various government departments including providing data capture for the DHSS at Newcastle upon Tyne. It later evolved into the M8000 system, based on Intel-processor-based systems.

In 1976, CMC merged with Microdata Corporation, a California-based computer company, whose 1973-released Reality operating and database environment product CMC was also distributing. The companies continued to use separate trading names in their respective regions until 1981. The Reality name was given to Microdata's computer system and the operating system—a version of the Pick operating system. Microdata owned rights to the Pick operating system in parallel with Dick Pick – who had developed it with Microdata. CMC Leasing Limited (the official trading name) then changed its name to Microdata UK limited, aka MUK. The company then started UK manufacture of the Reality range of computer systems in Hemel Hempstead. Microdata was purchased by McDonnell Douglas Corporation in 1985 and the company was re-branded as McDonnell Douglas Information Systems Limited (MDIS).

The company introduced the M9000 (called Sequoia in U.S.) which offered dynamic performance using soft loaded firmware and processor performance keys using the same hardware components to minimise sparing and maximise cost effectiveness, (although 1Mb memory sold for 25,000 GBP in those days). A new manufacturing and office complex was built in Boundary Way, Hemel Hempstead. Work started almost as soon as the building opened to double its size. The company then produced the UK designed Spirit processor which was launched as a lower-end Reality product as the M6000. Later the company developed the Series 19 (aka Pegasus) successor to the Sequoia using a development team spanning the engineering facilities in Hemel Hempstead, UK and Irvine, California.

In 1989, the second new building was completed. It accommodated the thousand staff then at the head office. At the time, the company was thought to have one of the largest company car fleets in the UK (Hertz).

1990s

1992 was the last year MDIS made a computer system from scratch, which meant the end of UK manufacturing. It continued its hardware and systems integration work. It could do this because it had produced RealityX, an open platform Reality environment (internally known for a time as CORA). This was the result of several years of development taking the Reality operating system (ROS) and re-engineering into a Unix application capable of running on non-MDIS computers. RealityX provided not only end user/application compatibility but also provided it at the developer assembler level. The same source code was used for RealityX and the original Reality implementations. RealityX allowed the Reality operating environment and applications developed for Reality to continue to be sold and maintained under the SeriesX name.

Initially MDIS used UNIX systems from Encore Computer, then from Motorola Computer Systems and Data General—all using M88k RISC processors and Unix System V. Later they moved to run on Solaris-based systems from Sun Microsystems. The open approach eventually led to a Microsoft Windows platform in 1995 and continued feature enhancements that are still being developed . As a corollary to this operating environment, MDIS acquired and developed its PROIV fourth generation language (4GL), which was used worldwide by companies including Fujitsu. A variant was implemented on REALITY called ALL (Application Language Liberator).

In 1993, a management buyout occurred. 29 Senior Managers and Directors of the company, under the leadership of CEO Jerry Causley, purchased the company through Barings Bank from McDonnell Douglas.

In 1994, the company was floated on the London Stock Exchange . Shares were sold for 260p each. Within two months they were worth less than 100p.

Through the latter part of the 1990s, most of the original directors and senior managers left, to be replaced by a new management group. The new CEO, John Klien, took the reins after the company issued yet another profit warning to the stock exchange. The company's key application products (Human Resources) were re-implemented in PRO-IV to improve product availability and functionality.

In 1998, the Maylands Park South Building in Hemel Hempstead was sold to 3Com. This complex had accommodated about 600 staff, who were either relocated to the other Maylands Park building or, with others in the group, made redundant.

In 1999, Chris Stone was appointed as CEO. At this time the company was losing about £100m a year and several years of downsizing and rationalisation followed. The company re-focused on its core, local Government and Public Sector (police, fire, and ambulance) markets and application products (Payroll, Pensions and HR systems). Services such as hardware maintenance and managed services were also offered.

2000s
In 2000, the company was rebranded to shed the old loss making image, and the company changed its name to Northgate Information Solutions. This was actually the name of a small software house which the old MDIS company purchased years earlier. Through "re-focusing", and the loss of about two-thirds of the original MDIS staff, the business finally regained profitability in 2001. Through the sale of the health business unit, the company raised capital for acquisitions.

In 2002, Northgate acquired Prolog (payroll outsourcing services). In 2003, The company acquired CaraPeople, (payroll outsourcing), blue8, (location and citizen centric IT systems for emergency services), Hays CSG, (data management information systems (police) and consulting), PWA Group, (HR applications).

In 2004  the company acquired Rebus (previously Peterborough Software), one of its main competitors (HR Group, which provides HR and payroll services), and CIM Systems (communication technologies for control room environments). As a result of its larger capitalisation, it became listed on the London Stock Exchange FTSE 250 Index.

in 2005 Sx3 and MVM Holdings were acquired, however a number of the old Northgate staff now felt that they were working for Sx3, due to the integration of their senior managers.

In June 2007, Northgate bought ARINSO to create NorthgateArinso (NGA) . NorthgateArinso in 2011 and 2012 was acknowledged in HR and payroll outsourcing by industry analysts such as Gartner, IDC and Everest Research.

Private-equity giant Kohlberg Kravis Roberts, (KKR) acquired Northgate in November 2007, for £593m. Northgate chairman at the time, Ron Mackintosh said the offer from KKR was good value and he predicted a bright future for the firm under private-equity ownership.

In November 2008, Northgate Information Solutions UK Ltd acquired Anite Public Sector Holdings Ltd from Anite plc. Convergys sold its Human Resources Management line of business to NorthgateArinso in 2010.

Northgate Managed Services, specialising in Managed IT Services to the UK mid-market, was acquired by Capita in February 2013.

Northgate Public Services was acquired by Cinven in December 2014.

In 2017, NGA HR (payroll service organization From Northgate Information Solutions) announced that it has sold its UK Mid-Market and UK SME sections to Bain Capital to focus on the growing demand from enterprise businesses for multi country HR and payroll services. 

The company acquired service design agency Snook in June 2019 and criminal justice software provider i2N in August 2018.

It was announced in January 2018 that following Bain Capital's acquisition of NGA HR's UK and Ireland division, they would rebrand as a separate company providing payroll services under the new name Zellis.

The company acquired APD Communications, a software supplier to the emergency services, public safety and control room markets in January 2019 and the specialist and care division EMIS Health in April 2019.

On August 22, 2019 it was announced that Alight Solutions would acquire NGA Human Resources.

Tina Whitley was appointed as new CEO on April 1, 2021.

The company changed its name to NEC Software Solutions UK on July 1, 2021.

Hertfordshire oil storage terminal fire
On Sunday, 11 December 2005, a major explosion and fire at the Buncefield oil depot immediately adjacent to the NIS building, effectively destroyed the Hemel Hempstead Head office complex. The two managed services staff manning the Data Centre escaped unharmed. Other Hemel Hempstead based staff were told to report to offices in Oxford and Peterborough the following week. The share price dipped on the first trading day afterwards, but recovered by lunchtime. The company had a well-practised disaster recovery programme, and the company moved its Managed Services customer system backups (which were stored off-site) to run on systems based at a site in Hounslow, where a number of Northgate staff ran these during the next few months. This included a full managed network for hospitals in East Anglia.  Despite this taking place in December, when payrolls are usually run earlier than normal, every payroll for all Northgate's customers was run on time.  The company became known as one that had successfully passed through a major physical disaster, and CEO Chris Stone was invited to speak at various venues on commercial disaster recovery.

In October 2006, the share price fluctuated, and the company announced that they were subject to an unsolicited takeover approach. It has since been announced that this has amounted to nothing.

In December 2007, Kohlberg Kravis Roberts agreed to buy the company for £593 million.

In March 2008, Northgate Information Systems plc was de-listed from the London Stock Exchange following completion of the purchase by KKR. The next month, Northgate achieved a position of forty-seventh out of one hundred in 'Britain's Top Employer 2008'.

Northgate Public Services was acquired by Cinven in December 2014. Northgate Managed Services, specialising in Managed IT Services to the UK mid-market, was acquired by Capita in February 2013.

Operations 
NEC Software Solutions UK operates in four sectors - Government, Healthcare, Housing and Public Safety. Offshore software development is provided by a Mumbai-based subsidiary which also specialises in software used in scientific publishing.

Government 
The company provides software and related services to the four UK governments. It also works with of UK local authorities, providing specialist applications and services to support the management of revenues and benefits, housing, environment and planning functions.

Healthcare 
The healthcare division specialises in medical registries and health screening. The company’s software has been used to screen millions of babies for hearing loss and other inherited conditions. It also supports national and local diabetic eye screening programmes. The company’s work in registries includes supporting the National Joint Registry as well as registries for robotic surgery and spinal treatments. The company announced a new partnership with the Walton Centre NHS Foundation Trust.

Housing 
The company's housing management solution is used to manage millions of homes worldwide. It works with local authorities and registered providers in the UK and also supports customers in Canada and Australia. In May 2020, the solution was selected by Colchester Borough Homes.

Public Safety 
This division covers the company's work in policing, emergency services, prisons, probation and critical infrastructure. Products include the CONNECT police platform as well as software supporting offender management, youth justice and major control rooms. In March 2020, subsidiary company APD Communications secured a contract to support the UK Home Office Emergency Services Network. In 2019, NEC Corporation also transferred global sales responsibility for its facial recognition product NeoFace Watch to this division.

See also
MultiValue — the original NoSQL database predating Oracle + SQL Server

References

External links

https://www.ngahr.com

NEC Corporation
Companies based in Hemel Hempstead
Human resource management consulting firms
Human resource management software
Software companies of the United Kingdom
Defunct computer companies of the United Kingdom
Defunct computer hardware companies
Defunct manufacturing companies of the United Kingdom
Kohlberg Kravis Roberts companies
McDonnell Douglas mergers and acquisitions
Computer companies established in 1969
Software companies established in 1969
Technology companies established in 1969
Holding companies established in 2014
Manufacturing companies disestablished in 1992
1969 establishments in the United Kingdom